Bairstow v Queens Moat Houses Plc [2001] EWCA Civ 712 is a UK company law case concerning shares.

Facts
Counsel argued that directors should be liable for unlawful distributions even when the company was solvent.

Judgment
Robert Walker LJ held that the idea that investors were getting a windfall was wrong. However it may be possible that in suing the directors, an equitable contribution from shareholders could be payable. That argument was not, however, raised here.

Sedley LJ concurred.

See also

UK company law

Notes

References

United Kingdom company case law
Court of Appeal (England and Wales) cases
2001 in case law
2001 in British law